PCPartPicker is a comparison shopping website that allows users to compare prices and compatibility of computer components on different retailers online. The website was created by Philip Carmichael in 2011. The website was substantially redesigned in February 2015. The website is funded through affiliate linking to sites such as Amazon.com. Additional functionality is available, such as providing building guides, sharing build lists, photos, and instruction, alerts for price drops, forums, and filters for automatically adjusting pre-made lists of components. They also make PC hardware reviews and custom build tutorials on their YouTube channel. They are currently located in Austin, TX.

References

External links
Website

Comparison shopping websites
Computing websites